The 2018 Sefton Metropolitan Borough Council election took place on 3 May 2018 to elect members of Sefton Metropolitan Borough Council in England. It was held on the same day as other local elections.

Labour retained control of the council with an increased majority, winning an additional three seats and winning their first seats in Southport. The Liberal Democrats led by former MP for Southport John Pugh, lost four seats in total whilst the Conservatives gained seats in the wards of Cambridge and Ainsdale.

Candidates

Ainsdale

Birkdale

Blundellsands

Cambridge

Church

Derby

Dukes

Ford

Harington

Kew

Litherland

Manor

Meols

Molyneux

Netherton & Orrell

Norwood

Park

Ravenmeols

St Oswald

Sudell

Victoria

References

2018 English local elections
2018
2010s in Merseyside